Zhaosu Tianma Airport is an airport in Zhaosu County, Ili Prefecture, Xinjiang, China. Construction for the  airport road began in 2017.

The airport will have a  runway (class 4C), a  terminal building, and five aircraft parking aprons. It is designed to serve 200,000 passengers and 600 tons of cargo annually by 2025.

The airport opened on January 28, 2022.

Airlines and destinations

See also
List of airports in China
List of the busiest airports in China

References

Airports in Xinjiang
Ili Kazakh Autonomous Prefecture